Events in the year 1985 in Turkey.

Parliament
 17th Parliament of Turkey

Incumbents
 President – Kenan Evren
 Prime Minister – Turgut Özal
 Leader of the opposition –
 Necdet Calp (up to 27 June)
Aydın Güven Gürkan (from 27 June)

Ruling party and the main opposition
 Ruling party – Motherland Party (ANAP)
 Main opposition
People’s Party (HP) (up to 3 November)
Social Democratic Populist Party (SHP) (from 3 November)

Cabinet
45th government of Turkey

Events

January 
 1 January – Value added tax (KDV) introduced.

February 
 13 February – National Salvation Party leaders are acquitted.
 26 February – Tarık Akan's Pehlivan wins honorable mention in 35th Berlin International Film Festival.

March 
 12 March – Armenian terrorists attack the Turkish embassy in Ottawa.

April 
 2 April – Prime Minister Turgut Özal meets President Ronald Reagan.

June 
 2 June – Fenerbahçe wins the championship.

July 
 9 July – State visit of Helmut Kohl, chancellor of Federal Republic of Germany.

October 
 20 October – Census (population 50,664,45)

November 
 3 November – Populist Party and Social Democracy Party merge to form Social Democratic Populist Party.
 7 November – Heavy rainfall in İstanbul
 14 November – Rahşan Ecevit, wife of Bülent Ecevit, founds Democratic Left Party (DSP).
 18 November – Rahşan Ecevit elected as the chairperson of Democratic Left Party (DSP).

Births
 12 March – Binnaz Uslu, middle distance runner
 13 March – Taner Sağır,  weightlifter
 23 April – Emrah Keskin, singer and winner of Türkstar
 17 August – Sema Apak, short distance runner
 5 November – Pınar Saka, sprinter

Deaths
 20 September – Ruhi Su  (born in 1912), folk singer
 7 October – Cemal Reşit Rey (born in 1904), composer
 24 November – Sinan Alaağaç (born 1960), footballer (goalkeeper)
 29 November – Afet İnan (born in 1908),  academic (Atatürk's adoptive daughter)

Gallery

See also
 Turkey in the Eurovision Song Contest 1984
 1984–85 1.Lig

References

 
Years of the 20th century in Turkey
Turkey
Turkey
Turkey